Bottici is an Italian surname.

List of people with the surname 

 Chiara Bottici (born 1975), Italian feminist philosopher and writer
 Laura Bottici (born 1972), Italian politician

See also 

 Botticini

Surnames
Surnames of Italian origin
Italian-language surnames